Baba Mountain may refer to:

 , in Republika Srpska
 Baba (North Macedonia), overlooking the city of Bitola
 Baba (Serbia), near Paraćin
 Etropolska Baba, in Balkan Mountains near Etropole
 Tetevenska Baba, in the Balkan Mountains near Teteven
 Chelopechka Baba, in the Balkan Mountains near Chelopech
 Baba Mountain, Rila, in the central Rila Mountains near the Rila Monastery
 Baba Mountain, Pirin, in the central Pirin Mountains near Orelyak
 Baba Mountain (Taiwan), in Taichung
 Koh-i-Baba or Baba Mountain range, Afghanistan

See also
 Loibler Baba, a 1969 m mountain south of Klagenfurt, above Loiblpass